Alejandro Argudín-Zaharia (born 10 March 1974 in Havana) is a retired Cuban-Romanian athlete who specialized in the 400 metres hurdles.

Biography
He was born from a Cuban geotechnical engineer father who worked for Embassy of Cuba in Bucharest and a Romanian mother.

His personal best time of 49.22 seconds, achieved when he won the gold medal at the 1997 Jeux de la Francophonie, is also a Romanian record.

Argudin-Zaharia retired in 1998 because of injury citing Achilles tendon rupture, and now works as a fitness instructor.

He was the fitness coach of the kickboxing stars Benjamin Adegbuyi and Bogdan and Andrei Stoica for some years until 2015.

References

1974 births
Living people
Cuban people of Romanian descent
People from Havana
Cuban male hurdlers
Romanian male hurdlers